Back to Back is a live album by the Mar-Keys and Booker T & the M.G.'s, released on Stax Records in 1967. It features both groups playing live on the Stax/Volt package tour of Europe. The album peaked at number 98 on the Billboard 200 album chart in the United States.

Track listing
"Philly Dog", "Grab This Thing", and "Last Night" are performed by the Mar-Keys (i.e., Booker T. & the M.G.'s plus the horn section of Wayne Jackson, Joe Arnold and Andrew Love). All other songs are performed by Booker T. & the MG's alone.

Side one
 "Green Onions" (Steve Cropper, Booker T. Jones, Lewis Steinberg, Al Jackson Jr.) – 4:55
 "Red Beans and Rice" (Cropper, Jones, Donald "Duck" Dunn, Jackson) – 1:55
 "Tic-Tac-Toe" (Cropper, Jones, Dunn, Jackson) – 2:35
 "Hip Hug-Her" (Cropper, Jones, Dunn, Jackson) – 2:51
 "Philly Dog" (Rufus Thomas) – 3:14
Side two
 "Grab This Thing" (Cropper) – 2:55
 "Last Night" (Charles "Packy" Axton, Gilbert Caple, Chips Moman, Floyd Newman, Jerry Lee "Smoochy" Smith) – 3:18
 "Gimme Some Loving" (Steve Winwood, Muff Winwood, Spencer Davis) – 2:56
 "Booker-Loo" (Cropper, Jones, Dunn, Jackson) – 3:18
 "Outrage"  (Cropper, Steinberg, Jackson) – 2:40

Personnel
Booker T. & the M.G.s
Booker T. Jones – organ
Steve Cropper – guitar
Donald Dunn – bass guitar
Al Jackson Jr. – drums
The Mar-Keys – Booker T. & the M.G.'s augmented by
Wayne Jackson – trumpet
Joe Arnold – alto saxophone
Andrew Love – tenor saxophone

References

Booker T. & the M.G.'s albums
1967 live albums
Albums produced by Jim Stewart (record producer)
Atlantic Records live albums
Stax Records live albums